RIOJA-1 was a submarine telecommunications cable system  linking the United Kingdom and Spain across the North Atlantic Ocean.

It had landing points in:
Porthcurno, Cornwall, United Kingdom
Virgen del Mar Beach, Santander, Spain

It was withdrawn from service on October 13, 2006.

References

Sources 
 
 

Submarine communications cables in the North Atlantic Ocean
Cantabria
Spain–United Kingdom relations
2006 disestablishments in England
2006 disestablishments in Spain